Scrubby Creek is a rural locality in the Blackall-Tambo Region, Queensland, Australia. In the  Scrubby Creek had a population of 5 people.

History 
The locality was named after a local creek of the same name.

In the  Scrubby Creek had a population of 5 people.

References 

Blackall-Tambo Region
Localities in Queensland